Minoru N. Tamura is a Japanese botanist at the Botanical Garden of the City University, Osaka. Tamura is a specialist in the taxonomy of the family Liliaceae who has significantly contributed to the "Flora of China" and the "Flora of Thailand".

Tamura's system of classification of the Liliaceae in 1998 was a significant step in the modern understanding of this family.

Publications 
Minoru N. Tamura, Shingchi Chen, Nicholas J. Turland. A New Combination in Heteropolygonatum (Convallariaceae, Polygonateae) NOVON 10(2): 156-157. 2000.
Minoru N. Tamura, Liang Songyun (Liang Song-jun) and Nicholas J. Turland. New Combinations in Campylandra (Convallariaceae, Convallarieae). Novon Vol. 10, No. 2 (Summer, 2000), pp. 158-160
Jun Yamashita, Art Vogel, Minoru N. Tamura. 2007. Molecular Phylogeny and Taxonomic Reconsideration of the Genus Peliosanthes (Convallariaceae)». 12th Flora of Thailand Meeting
Minoru N. Tamura. Phylogenetic analyses and chromosome evolution in Convallarieae (Ruscaceae sensu lato), with some taxonomic treatments  J. Plant Res. 117 (5): 363—370 2004
Chen Xinqi, Liang Songyun, Xu Jiemei, Minoru N. Tamura. Liliaceae Flora of China 24: 73–263 2000

 In 
 In 
 In

References

External links 
Harvard University: Index of Botanists
Wikigenes
ISPN: List of species described by author
"Tamura, Minoru N. (fl. 1993)" at ISPN

Botanists with author abbreviations
20th-century Japanese botanists
Academic staff of Osaka City University
21st-century Japanese botanists